A food or eating addiction is any behavioral addiction that is primarily characterized by the compulsive consumption of palatable (e.g., high fat and high sugar) food items which markedly activate the reward system in humans and other animals despite adverse consequences.

Psychological dependence has also been observed with the occurrence of withdrawal symptoms when consumption of these foods stops by replacement with foods low in sugar and fat. Because this addictive behavior is not biological, one cannot develop a trait that codes for an eating disorder, so professionals address this by providing behavior therapy and by asking a series of questions called the YFAS (Yale Food Addiction Scale) questionnaire, a diagnostic criteria of substance dependence.

Sugary and high-fat food have both been shown to increase the expression of ΔFosB, an addiction biomarker, in the D1-type medium spiny neurons of the nucleus accumbens; however, there is very little research on the synaptic plasticity from compulsive food consumption, a phenomenon which is known to be caused by ΔFosB overexpression.

Description
"Food addiction" refers to compulsive overeaters who engage in frequent episodes of uncontrollable eating (binge eating). The term binge eating means eating an unhealthy amount of food while feeling that one's sense of control has been lost. At first, the food addiction comes in the form of cravings, so a person is naturally caught unaware when suddenly they find that they cannot cope without the craving. The person's behavior then begins to shift when the need for more food is not met, in that when the urge is met, binge eating disorder, obesity and bulimia nervosa can result as a consequence. To show this, a study done by Sara Parylak and her peers in the physiology and behavior journal reveals that animal models given free access to food became more emotionally withdrawn after the food was taken away from them due to the anxiogenic-like stimuli (substance) pestering them for more food. This kind of behavior shows that food addiction is not only a self control problem, but that it goes deeper than that, it is the body controlling a person to the point where the individual has no say on what goes into their bodies despite all the consequences that can come from overeating. People who engage in binge eating may feel frenzied, and consume a large number of calories before stopping.
Food binges may be followed by feelings of guilt and depression; for example, some will cancel their plans for the next day because they "feel fat." Binge eating also has implications on physical health, due to excessive intake of fats and sugars, which can cause numerous health problems.

Unlike individuals with bulimia nervosa, compulsive overeaters do not attempt to compensate for their bingeing with purging behaviors, such as fasting, laxative use, or vomiting. When compulsive overeaters overeat through binge eating and experience feelings of guilt after their binges, they can be said to have binge eating disorder (BED).

In addition to binge eating, compulsive overeaters may also engage in "grazing" behavior, during which they continuously eat throughout the day. These actions result in an excessive overall number of calories consumed, even if the quantities eaten at any one time may be small.

During binges, compulsive overeaters may consume between 5,000 and 15,000 food calories daily (far more than is healthy), resulting in a temporary release from psychological stress through an addictive high not unlike that experienced through drug abuse. Compulsive overeaters tend to show brain changes similar to those of drug addicts, a result of excessive consumption of highly processed food (most likely consisting of high amounts of saturated fat, which is more energy-rich).

Signs and symptoms
A food addiction features compulsive overeating, such as binge eating behavior, as its core and only defining feature. There are several potential signs that a person may be experiencing compulsive overeating. Common behaviors of compulsive overeaters include eating alone, consuming food quickly, and gaining weight rapidly, and eating to the point of feeling sick to the stomach. Other signs include significantly decreased mobility and the withdrawal from activities due to weight gain. Emotional indicators can include feelings of guilt, a sense of loss of control, depression and mood swings.

Hiding consumption is an emotional indicator of other symptoms that could be a result of having a food addiction. Hiding consumption of food includes eating in secret, late at night, in the car, and hiding certain foods until ready to consume in private. Other signs of hiding consumption are avoiding social interactions to eat the specific foods that are craved. Other emotional indicators are inner guilt; which includes making up excuses to why the palatable food would be beneficial to consume, and then feeling guilty about it shortly after consuming.

Sense of loss of control is indicated in many ways which includes, going out of the way to obtain specific foods, spending unnecessary amounts of money on foods to satisfy cravings. Difficulty concentrating on things such as a job or career can indicate sense of loss of control by not being able to organize thoughts leading to a decrease in efficiency. Other ways to indicate the sense of loss of control, are craving food despite being full. One may set rules to try to eat healthy but the cravings overrule and the rules are abandoned. One big indicator of loss of control due to food addiction is even though one knows they have a medical problem caused by the craved foods, they cannot stop consuming the foods, which can be detrimental to their health.

Food addiction has some physical signs and symptoms. Decreased energy; not being able to be as active as in the past, not being able to be as active as others around, also a decrease in efficiency due to the lack of energy. Having trouble sleeping; being tired all the time such as fatigue, oversleeping, or the complete opposite and not being able to sleep such as insomnia. Other physical signs and symptoms are restlessness, irritability, digestive disorders, and headaches.

In extreme cases food addiction can result in suicidal thoughts.

Effects 
Obesity has been attributed to eating behavior or fast food, personality issues, depression, genetics but also social and environmental conditions such as walkability and access to diverse foods. The lack of access to diverse foods could also be caused by food deserts. Moreover, some other effects of obesity could also lead to increased risk for type 2 diabetes, cardiovascular diseases and certain cancers. One supplementary explanation for the epidemic of obesity overall might be food addiction.

Management

Compulsive overeating is treatable with nutritional assistance and medication. Psychotherapy may also be required, but recent research has proven this to be useful only as a complementary resource, with short-term effectiveness in middle to severe cases.

Lisdexamfetamine is an FDA-approved appetite suppressant drug that is indicated (i.e., used clinically) for the treatment of binge eating disorder. The antidepressant fluoxetine is a medication that is approved by the Food and Drug Administration for the treatment of an eating disorder, specifically bulimia nervosa. This medication has been prescribed off-label for the treatment of binge eating disorder. Off-label medications, such as other selective serotonin reuptake inhibitors (SSRIs), have shown some efficacy, as have several atypical antidepressants, such as mianserin, trazodone and bupropion. Anti-obesity medications have also proven very effective. Studies suggest that anti-obesity drugs, or moderate appetite suppressants, may be key to controlling binge eating.

Many eating disorders are thought to be behavioral patterns that stem from emotional struggles; for the individual to develop lasting improvement and a healthy relationship with food, these affective obstacles need to be resolved. Individuals can overcome compulsive overeating through treatment, which should include talk therapy and medical and nutritional counseling. Such counseling has been recently sanctioned by the American Dental Association in their journal article cover-story for the first time in history in 2012: Given "the continued increase in obesity in the United States and the willingness of dentists to assist in prevention and interventional effort, experts in obesity intervention in conjunction with dental educators should develop models of intervention within the scope of dental practice." Moreover, dental appliances such as conventional jaw wiring and orthodontic wiring for controlling compulsive overeating have been shown to be efficient ways in terms of weight control in properly selected obese patients and usually no serious complications could be encountered through the treatment course.

As well, several twelve-step programs exist to help members recover from compulsive overeating and food addiction, such as Overeaters Anonymous.

As of 2018, the Ontario Health Insurance Plan has announced a new program designed to assist individuals struggling with food addiction.

Prognosis
Once an eating disorder such as BED is developed there are two potential pathways that can occur for an individual.

Getting help is the first step to getting better but the chances for relapse are high. Those with a food addiction were most likely overweight in childhood which leads to treatment resistance the longer gone untreated. Due to poor mental health and lack of control and environmental factors, overeaters relapse into their old habits even after completing various treatments. BED patients often report and acknowledge using substances daily as a coping mechanism.

However, there is a 50% of recovery at the end of treatment and follow-ups. Overcoming a food addiction isn't easy but those who accomplish it possess enough confidence to change, go through required examinations but most importantly, they receive support and encouragement from their loved ones and environment.

Ultimately, there is no guaranteed prognosis for food addictions. More studies are currently being conducted in order to understand food addictions along with other eating disorders.

A food addiction can lead to chronic conditions and eventually death. Nevertheless, there is a higher chance of recovery when treated in early stages such as teenage years when the symptoms are more noticeable then adulthood where there is more denial on part of the individual.

Epidemiology
A review on behavioral addictions listed the estimated the lifetime prevalence (i.e., the proportion of individuals in the population that developed the disorder during their lifetime) for food addiction in the United States as 2.8%.

Obesity is becoming a worldwide problem. A sugar tax is set to be introduced in Ireland to minimise the consumption of harmful foods and drinks.

Summary of addiction-related plasticity

See also

References

Further reading 

 
 "Eating Awareness Training" Molly Gregor, copyright 1983 "...reclaim (your) 'birthright', the right to eat without compulsion, obsession, or suffering. ...what the body wants, as much as it wants, whenever it wants." From the Preface by Thomas Lebherz, M.D.

External links 
 

Behavioral addiction
Eating disorders
Hyperalimentation
Obesity